Senator Miner may refer to:

Ahiman Louis Miner (1804–1886), Vermont State Senate
Craig Miner (fl. 1980s–2010s), Connecticut State Senate
Doris Miner (born 1936), South Dakota State Senate
Eliphalet S. Miner (1818–1890), Wisconsin State Senate
Phineas Miner (1777–1839), Connecticut State Senate

See also
Senator Minor (disambiguation)
Sarah Minear (fl. 1980s–2010s), West Virginia State Senate
Theodore L. Minier (1819–1895), New York State Senate
Ruth Ann Minner (born 1935), Delaware State Senate